Edmundo Robinson (born October 16, 1996) is an American soccer player who plays as a forward.

References

External links
 
 Profile at Queens Athletics

1996 births
Living people
American soccer players
American expatriate soccer players
Association football midfielders
People from Stone Mountain, Georgia
Soccer players from Georgia (U.S. state)
Sportspeople from DeKalb County, Georgia
Greenville Triumph SC players
Myllykosken Pallo −47 players
Peachtree City MOBA players
Queens Royals men's soccer players
SC United Bantams players
USL League One players
USL League Two players
Expatriate footballers in Finland
American expatriate sportspeople in Finland